The Rockeskyller Kopf near Rockeskyll in the county of Vulkaneifel in the German state of Rhineland-Palatinate is a hill, in the Eifel mountains. It is an extinct volcano complex from the Quaternary period, around 360,000 years old and is designated as a natural monument (ND-7233-420).

Geography

Location 
The Rockeskyller Kopf lies within the Volcanic Eifel Nature Park. Its summit rises around  1 kilometre west of Rockeskyll, 1 kilometre east of Bewingen and 1.6 kilometres southeast of Dohm-Lammersdorf. Flowing past the hill to the east is the  Kaulbach, a right headstream of the Hangelsbach which passes to the southeast; the latter discharges southeast of the hill near the Pelm settlement of Schloßbrunnen Gerolstein into the Kyll which in turn runs past to the southwest and south.

Natural regions  
The Rockeskyller Kopf belongs to the natural regional major unit group of the East Eifel (no. 27), in the major unit of the Limestone Eifel (276), in the sub-unit of the Northern Volcanic Eifel (276.8) and to the natural regions of Kyll-Volcanic Eifel (Kyll-Vulkaneifel, 276.80) in the west and Dockweiler Volcanic Eifel (Dockweiler Vulkaneifel, 276.81) in the east.

Surrounding volcanic region 
The Rockeskyller Kopf is part of a volcanic complex, which comprises several cinder cones that are interconnected. The neighbouring kuppen of the Mäuseberg and Giesenheld also belong to this complex. Experts estimate that there were five to seven eruption sites which built up successively during the course of volcanic activity and were linked together and overlapped.

The cinder cone the typical positive landscape and volcanic shape of the Eifel – in contrast with the maars, which as volcanic pipes represent a negative landscape form.

Formation 
The formation of the Rockeskyller Kopf began, as in the case of the maars, with steam explosions, which piled up coarse-grained lapilli. Next came  Strombolian eruptions, as the intermittent ejection of incandescent cinder is called. The hot cinders melted on impact to become scoria, which is easily confused with lava flows. In the final phase, lava streams were outpoured, whose remains may still be seen as lava sheets or pipe filling.

The photograph of the longitudinally section rim of the crater shows this succession. The reddish strata sloping to the left are the depositions of lapilli. On their right flank follow, first of all, a thin layer of ejected material (tuff) and then the thicker, black layer of scoria.

Protected areas  
On the Rockeskyller Kopf are parts of the protected landscape of Gerolstein and Surrounding Area (Gerolstein und Umgebung, CDDA no. 321065; designated in 1983; 124.1171 km2) and of the Vulkaneifel bird reserve (VSG no. 5706-401; 11.25 km2).

See also 
 List of volcanoes of Germany

Literature 
 Vulkanologische Karte West- und Hocheifel 1:50.000 von G. Büchel; Institut für Geowissenschaften Uni Mainz, 1994
 Vulkan Rockeskyller Kopf – Flyer der Georoute Gerolsteiner Land (P. Bitschene), 2007
 Cliff S. J. Shaw, Alan B. Woodland, Jens Hopp und Nesha D. Trenholm: Structure and evolution of the Rockeskyllerkopf Volcanic Complex, West Eifel Volcanic Field, Germany in Bulletin of Volcanology

External links 

 Vulkankomplex Rockeskyller Kopf, at the Landesamt für Geologie und Bergbau Rheinland-Pfalz, at lgb-rlp.de
 Der Rockeskyller Kopf als Forschungsobjekt, at scinexx.de
 Rockeskyller Kopf (Kyller Kopf) (Mineral database), at mindat.org

References 

Cinder cones
Vulkaneifel
Mountains and hills of the Eifel